Sun Ming Him (born 19 June 2000) is a Hong Kong professional footballer who currently plays for Hong Kong Premier League club Eastern.

Early years
In 2016, Sun was selected and sent abroad to receive training at Bayern Munich.

Club career
While playing for Tai Po, Sun became the youngest-ever Hong Kong Premier League’s monthly Most Valuable Player in February 2020.

On 17 October 2020, it was revealed that Sun had joined Pegasus.

On 26 August 2021, Sun joined Eastern.

International career
Sun made his international debut against Chinese Taipei on 11 June 2019 at the age of only 18.

Career statistics

Club

Notes

International

International goals

References

External links

Living people
2000 births
Hong Kong footballers
Hong Kong international footballers
Association football forwards
Hong Kong Premier League players
Hong Kong First Division League players
Hoi King SA players
Tai Po FC players
TSW Pegasus FC players
Eastern Sports Club footballers